KJDL-FM (105.3 FM) is a radio station broadcasting a Spanish Christian format. Licensed to Levelland, Texas, United States, the station serves the Lubbock area. The station is currently owned by Enrique Garza’s Christian Ministries of the Valley, Inc. and features an all Spanish Christian

History
The station went on the air as KLVT-FM on March 8, 1991. On July 24, 2007, the station changed its call sign to the current KJDL-FM.

Delbert L. Kirby had been an announcer and newscaster in Lubbock, Big Spring and Levelland for many years. Kirby was working at KLVT (AM) when he decided to file an application for an empty FM channel (288A or 105.5 MHz) in Levelland. Kirby was KLVT news director when the application showed up in Broadcasting magazine. The KLVT manager saw this and fired Kirby. Kirby sold merchandise door to door while he worked on his application. He'd obtained an SBA backed loan and contacted Charles "Charlie" Wilson to install the station equipment.

Original airdate was in fall of 1979. Call letters were KHOC for Hockley County. Studios and tower were on 13th street between avenue Q and avenue S in southwest Levelland.

Original equipment was provided by Don Jones of Amarillo, Texas as representative of McMartin Industries. KHOC began with a five-room  by  prefab building at the tower site. There was an office, a bathroom, a small production area, the on the air control room, and the transmitter room. There was a McMartin B-502 console, two turntables, an ITC (International Tapetronics Corporation) 3D cart player and an ITC PD-II recorder, an electrovoice microphone, two Marti Electronics CLA-40 compressor limiters, and a McMartin BF-3.5K transmitter feeding  of 1 5/8" feed line into a three bay Phelps Dodge antenna on a rented two way tower.

The station later raised power to 6,000 watts still on 105.5, sold to KLVT (AM) changed letters to KLVT-FM. A new site and change to class C3 on 105.3 occurred in _, and the most recent change to 105.3C2 and a new site occurred in 2008.

The station sold to Walker Broadcasting in 2007. The format was originally syndicated variety "Jack-FM" and was changed to a Country format in January 2009. In November 2009, longtime country DJ Neely Yates joined the on-air staff. In the following months, the station's format shifted to a "Texas Country" playlist, playing all Texas Country Music and rebranding as The Red Dirt Rebel 105.3.

On June 25, 2019, Enrique Garza’s Christian Ministries of the Valley closed a $312,500 deal to buy KJDL-FM from Walker Broadcasting. The sales price included a $100,000 promissory note.

Former on-air staff
David Wilde
Neely Yates
Jess Walker
Jamie Lassiter
Tommy Turner
Quayde Addison

Previous logo
  (KJDL-FM's logo under previous "True Country" branding)

References

External links

JDL-FM